Fabrice Notari (born 26 April 1958) is a Monegasque politician, architect and former alpine skier. He competed in two events at the 1988 Winter Olympics.  He is a member of Priorité Monaco, and is a member of the National Council of Monaco. Notari is President of the Parliamentary Commission for Monitoring Relations with the European Union within the National Council (Monaco)

References

1958 births
Living people
Monegasque male alpine skiers
Olympic alpine skiers of Monaco
Alpine skiers at the 1988 Winter Olympics
Place of birth missing (living people)
Members of the National Council (Monaco)